Kumasi Centre for Collaborative Research in Tropical Medicine (KCCR) is a Biomedical research institute located at the Kwame Nkrumah University of Science and Technology in Kumasi, Ghana. It is a joint venture between the Ministry of Health (MoH) and the Bernhard Nocht Institute for Tropical Medicine in Hamburg, Germany. It was founded in 1998 and has about 250-300 workers. The centre's objective is to develop a series of world research programs through the acquisition of research grants. The center also tests and confirms samples for COVID-19 pandemic in Ghana.

The facility was made one of the many others in Ghana certified to undertake COVID-19 tests in the country.

History 
KCCR is an international platform for biomedical research and a nonprofit research centre in Ghana and globally. It is based on the campus of KNUST in Kumasi in the Ashanti region in the country. It has close cooperation with the Medical School and other related facilities making it develop into a research centre of the College of Health Sciences.

Supports 
StanChart Bank supported the KCCR with PCR to expand testing capabilities for the fight against Coronavirus. The Chamber of Bulk Oil Distributors also supported the centre with GH¢100,000.

References 

Medical research institutes in Ghana
Kwame Nkrumah University of Science and Technology